Muchachitas (English title: Girls) is a Mexican telenovela produced by Emilio Larrosa for Televisa in 1991. The telenovela was also shown on Univisión in the early 1990s.

The lead roles are played by Cecilia Tijerina, Tiaré Scanda, Emma Laura, Kate del Castillo, Tere Salinas, Yolanda Ventura and Itatí Cantoral. Diego Schoening, Raúl Alberto, Roberto Palazuelos, José Flores, Ari Telch and Charlie Massó also star, along with Alejandro Camacho, Pilar Pellicer, Karen Sentíes, Kenia Gazcón, Lorena Herrera, Carlos Rotzinger, Carlos Miguel, and Carlos Cardán .

Plot
Four girls (Mónica, Elena, Leticia and Isabel) enroll in an art academy to pursue their dreams of careers in acting and singing. The four are from different backgrounds:

Monica is wealthy but humble and sweet. She dates Rodrigo, who works under her father at their supermarket and drives a taxi on the side. When Rodrigo is framed by Monica's cousin Federico and sent to jail for industrial espionage, she stands by him, but she cannot forget her previous boyfriend Roger, who was also the object of attempted murder by Federico.
Elena is poor and tough. She was Rodrigo's first girlfriend, but Rodrigo dumped her for Monica, causing a rift between the two girls. Later, however, it is revealed that Elena's father is also Monica's biological father; their respective mothers, also active in theater, had been friends and rivals.
Isabel is middle-class and selfless. She lives with her widowed father. She gets involved with Pedro, who turns out to be married, but though Pedro's terminally ill wife forgives her and entrusts her with the care of their daughter, Betty, she distrusts Pedro.
Leticia is a middle-class social climber, who is not hesitant to speak her mind and to pretend to get on with rich men. She eventually "marries" Federico, not realizing that the wedding has no legal effect (the license was not properly filed). She is later sent to work for her grandmother, who was also once a social climber but has mellowed and grown wiser.

Cast

 Cecilia Tijerina as Mónica Sánchez-Zúñiga Montealegre
 Tiaré Scanda as Elena Olivares Pérez
 Kate del Castillo as Leticia Bustamante Ballesteros
 Emma Laura as Isabel Flores Falcón
 Jorge Lavat as Guillermo Sánchez-Zúñiga
 Alejandro Camacho as Federico Cantú Sánchez-Zúñiga
 Laura León as Esther Pérez de Olivares
 Pilar Pellicer as Martha Sánchez-Zúñiga Vda. de Cantú
 Roberto Palazuelos as Roger Guzmán
 María Rojo as Esperanza Ballesteros de Bustamante
 July Furlong as Verónica Montealegre de Sánchez-Zúñiga #1
 Tina Romero as Verónica Montealegre de Sánchez-Zúñiga #2
 Diego Schoening as Rodrigo Suárez
 Carlos Cardán as José "Pepe" Olivares
 Sergio Kleiner as Alberto Barbosa
 Gabriela Araujo as Profesora Carmen Márquez
 Edith Kleiman as Angélica Benítez
 Antonio Medellín as Alfredo Flores
 Manolita Saval as Enriqueta
 Armando de Pascual as Francisco "Pancho" Bustamante
 Charlie Massó as Mauricio Rubio
 Mercedes Pascual as Bertha Vda. de Ballesteros
 Mario Sauret as Don Julio Linares
 Ari Telch as Joaquín Barbosa
 Arturo Alegro as Don Héctor Suárez
 Kenia Gazcón as Margarita Villaseñor
 Lorena Herrera as Claudia Villaseñor
 Carlos Rotzinger as Luis Villaseñor
 Tere Salinas as Paola
 José Flores as Rolando Fasoles
 Raúl Alberto as Raúl Rivas
 Sergio Sendel as Pedro Ortigoza Domínguez
 Ana María Aguirre as Constanza de Villaseñor
 Anahí as Betty Ortigoza
 Itatí Cantoral as Lucía Aguilera
 Carlos Miguel as Óscar Luna
 Guillermo Orea Jr. as Tolomeo
 Héctor Soberón as Víctor
 Lorena Tassinari as Lucrecia Pons
 Ricardo Barona as Abel
 Karen Sentíes as Renata Chompester
 Yolanda Ventura as Gloria
 Vanessa Villela as Andrea
 Marigel as Noemí
 Miguel Garza as Sergio
 Luis Cárdenas as Bernardo Trueba
 Karina Castañeda as Silvia Bustamante Ballesteros
 Gloria Izaguirre as Laura
 María Prado as Rosa Rivas
 Dolores Salomón "La Bodoquito" as Concha "Conchita"
 Rocío Sobrado as Andrea de Ortigoza
 Patricia Valdés
 Fernando Pinkus
 Evelyn Murillo
 Susana Carens
 Edmundo Barahona
 Amparo Garrido

Awards

References

External links 

1991 telenovelas
Mexican telenovelas
1991 Mexican television series debuts
1992 Mexican television series endings
Spanish-language telenovelas
Television shows set in Mexico City
Television shows set in New York City
Televisa telenovelas